Livsejávrre is a lake in the municipality of Hamarøy in Nordland county, Norway. The ending -jávrre is the Lule Sami language word for lake.

See also
List of lakes in Norway

References

Hamarøy
Lakes of Nordland